Yunker Kotei Eki, is a health tonic similar to Lipovitan and produced by the Sato Pharmaceutical Corporation in Japan. It was first produced in 1967, and is widely available at drug stores throughout Japan. Yunker contains Chinese herbal ingredients and caffeine and is marketed to the Japanese workforce to combat fatigue.

It is one of 33 tonics manufactured by Sato for a range of ailments related to fatigue. The Yunker line of tonics is also sold in the U.S., Europe and Singapore, but the contents of some tonics have been altered to meet domestic regulations.

A USDA report from 2002 reported that exports of Yunkeru Kotei-eki to six countries including the United States, Germany, Canada and Singapore were continuing to grow, and that Sato planned to start exports to Thailand later that year.

Ingredients
Yunker Kotei contains the following ingredients (quantities are quoted per 30ml daily dose):
sugars: 7g
vitamin E: 10 IU
Thiamin: 4.2 mg
Riboflavin: 3.8 mg
Vitamin B6: 5.0 mg
Vitamin B12: 2.0μg
Niacin: 10 mg
Sodium: 30 mg
Royal jelly: 100 mg
Barrenwort Fluid Extract (Leaf) 100 mg
Cnidium Fluid Extract (Fruit) 100 mg
Asian Ginseng Extract (Root) 10 mg
Hawthorn Berry Extract (Fruit) 3 mg
Viper Tincture 100 mg
Civet Tincture 100 mg

See also
Energy drink
Lipovitan

References

External links
Sato Pharmaceutical Corporation - Japanese website
Sato Pharmaceutical Canada Inc - Canadian website
 - US website

Patent medicines